Welsh tower houses were fortified stone houses that were built between the early 14th and 15th centuries. They are related to tower houses, which occur in considerable numbers in Ireland and Scotland and to a much lesser extent in England. A map showing the distribution of tower houses within the United Kingdom is given in Houses of the Welsh Countryside.

Distribution of tower houses in Wales
The main concentration of tower houses is in southern Pembrokeshire, Wales. These were first published with detailed drawings in 1877–8 by Rev. E L Barnwell. The Pembrokeshire examples have a coastal distribution; this is also true of the Monmouth and Glamorgan tower houses, as well as the demolished examples at Penhryn (in Caernarfonshire) and Ty Gwyn (in Abermo). Otherwise, the tower houses are distributed along the Welsh—English border, with one example, Wattlesborourgh, just over the border in Shropshire. In 1976, Hilling produced a map (with listing) showing seventeen examples. Further houses have been  added by Suggett and it is possible that new examples will be recognised as being incorporated into existing buildings, as at Sandyhaven House in Pembrokeshire.

Dating and features of Welsh tower houses
The Welsh tower houses are not particularly large and have up to three storeys above an undercroft, as at the Old Rectory, Angle and the Tower at Talgarth. Smith distinguished a smaller group of house which only have one storey above an undercroft, The best example of this type is Carswell in Pembrokeshire. Smith compared this group to the Irish £10 tower houses. These were built after 1427 when a statute was passed that any of the King’s liege living within The Pale would be paid £10 for building a house of a minimum size. It seems likely that the Welsh houses were built about the same time.”

Taller tower houses, such as the  Old Rectory, Angle, are likely to have been built before 1400, as they have arrow slits, rather than an early form of gun port, which would have been used after that date. At Penhryn, Licence to crenellate was granted in 1438. The internal round staircase at the corner at the Old Rectory, Angle is similar to some Irish tower houses and some the Welsh tower house have projecting garderobes similar to the Scottish and Irish tower houses. There is also some evidence that a  stone or timber hall would have been built or added to the tower at the same time or shortly after the tower house was built. At Eastington and Bonville Court, the tower which was built against a hall, is rectangular, rather than square. The Old Rectory at Angle clearly shows the evidence for a gable of a hall butting up against the tower.

List of Welsh tower houses

Breconshire

  The Tower, Scethrog.
  The Tower, Talgarth. Three storeys over an undercroft.

Denbighshire
 Bodidris, Llandegla  Possible example.

Caernarfonshire

 Penrhyn Castle.Tower demolished, but licence to crenellate granted in 1438   
 ?Pen-y-Bryn, Aber. Possibly a Medieval Tower, but much altered in the 16th century.

Flintshire

 Tower (Rheinallt ap Gruffydd’s, Tower)., Broncoed, Mold.

Glamorgan
 Candleston Castle, Bridgend.
 Oxwich Castle 
 Weobley Castle, Gower

Merioneth
 Ty-gwyn, Abermo. Demolished.

Montgomeryshire

 Powis Castle. The East Gate appears originally to have been a Tower House, which has had an entrance made through the vaulted undercroft, probably in the 17th century. An extra storey was add to the tower in 1815-1818 when Sir Robert Smirke refenestrated the castle and added Gothic Revival battlements. Without these additions and alterations, the East Gate  is very similar to the Tower houses at Tower near Mold and Angle in Pembrokeshie. This is illustrated by  J P Neale's print of 1829.

Monmouthshire
 Kemeys Manor, Newport 
 Penhow Castle, Penhow

Pembrokeshire

Angle. Old Rectory. Three storeys over a vaulted store room 
 Carswell, Penally
 Eastington, Rhoscrowther. Rectangular, rather than square tower, with adjacent halls 
Bonville’s Castle   
Priory Farm, Pembroke
Roch Castle 
West Tarr Farm, St Florence. Two vaulted chambers, one over the other.
Kingston Farm, St Michaels 
Sandyhaven House, St Ishmael’s. Incorporated into main house. 
Sister’s House, Minwear

Welsh Marches
 Wattlesborourgh, Alberbury, Shropshire. This Tower House is very close to the Welsh border and would have been considered part of Wales prior to the Acts of Union

Welsh Tower house Gallery

See also
 Scottish Vernacular
 Tower houses in Britain and Ireland
 Vernacular architecture

References

Bibliography
  Barnwell E L Domestic Architecture of South Pembrokeshire, Archaeologia Cambrensis, Vol 13, 1867, 193-204, 363-374 & Vol 14,1868, 70–84.  
 Hilling J B., Historic Architecture of Wales: An Introduction Univ. Wales Press, Cardiff, 1976 
 Scourfield R and Haslam R  The Buildings of Wales: Powys; Montgomeryshire, Radnorshire and Breconshire. Yale University Press 2013
 Smith P Houses of the Welsh Countryside, 2nd Edition, 1988, HMSO/ RCAHMW
 Suggett R and Stevenson G Introducing Houses of the Welsh Countryside. Cyflwyno Cartrefi Cefn Gwlad Cymru. Y Lolfa/ RCAHMW, 2010

Welsh
Architecture in Wales
14th-century fortifications
14th century in Wales
15th-century fortifications
15th century in Wales